Piano Sonata No. 11 may refer to: 
Piano Sonata No. 11 (Beethoven)
Piano Sonata No. 11 (Mozart)
Piano Sonata No. 11 (Prokofiev)